Thaman Kumar is an Indian actor who has appeared in Tamil language films. He made his breakthrough in the 2012 film Sattam Oru Iruttarai, opposite Bindu Madhavi.

Career
Thaman Kumar was signed up for a film titled London Maappillai in 2011 but the film failed to finish production, and thus his first release became the thriller Aachariyangal (2012). He replaced Vikram Prabhu in Sneha Britto's Sattam Oru Iruttarai after a successful audition and featured in the lead role opposite Bindu Madhavi and Piaa Bajpai. The film, a remake of the yesteryear film of the same name, was released with little publicity and failed at the box office, with a critic noting "Thaman Kumar showed signs of confidence". He will be next seen in Summa Nachunu Irukku (2013) alongside Vibha Natarajan. His upcoming films include Sethu Bhoomi with Samskruthy Shenoy and a film with Dileepan and Srushti Dange.

Filmography

Films

Television

References

Indian male film actors
Tamil male actors
Living people
Male actors in Tamil cinema
Year of birth missing (living people)